"Southern Star" is a song written Rich Alves, Steve Dean and Roger Murrah, and recorded by American country music band Alabama.  It was released in November 1989 as the fourth and final single and title track from the album Southern Star.  The song hit number one in the United States on the Hot Country Singles charts.

Chart history

Year-end charts

Other versions
David Allan Coe recorded the song on his 1989 album Crazy Daddy.

References

External links

1989 singles
Alabama (American band) songs
David Allan Coe songs
Songs written by Roger Murrah
Song recordings produced by Barry Beckett
RCA Records singles
1989 songs
Songs written by Steve Dean
Songs written by Rich Alves
Songs about the American South